Camille de Casabianca (born 31 October 1960) is a French filmmaker/writer.

Biography
Camille de Casabianca was born 31 October 1960, in Paris. She received a master of arts degree in Political Science from University of California, Berkeley.

Casabianca's selected films include Peking Central, a comedy set in Mainland China, Madame Petlet's True Story, a French comedy, and Vive Nous!, a romantic comedy about social class and judo. Her film Let's Party was released in 2010 in France and selected by various festivals throughout the world (Nyon International Film Festival, Ronda International Film Festival, Buenos Aires 2011 FICIP). Her film Family Harmony (2013) features Georges Kiejman, known as lawyer and former Minister of the French government. In September 2019, Ca marche !? was released in France. This documentary penetrates the world of En Marche, the political movement created in 2016 which brought to power French President Emmanuel Macron and 315 Parliament members.

In 2022, Departure Time, L'Heure du départ, her eleventh feature, is released in Europe. It generates many debates on the end of life subject.

Casabianca's published work includes Le Lapin Enchanté (Le Seuil, 2005) and Gourou (Leo Scheer, 2011).

Films
1986 Peking Central (Pékin Central)

1988 After the Rain (Après la pluie)

1990 The Fruit of Thy Womb (Le Fruit de vos entrailles)

1991 Octavio

1995 Madame Petlet's True Story (Le Fabuleux destin de Madame Petlet)

2000 Long Live Us! (Vive nous!)

2003 Tatami

2010 Let's Party (C'est parti)

2013 Family Harmony (L'Harmonie familiale)

2019 Once upon a time in France (Ca marche!?)

2022 Departure Time (L'Heure du départ)

Awards
She received a 1996 21st Century Filmmaker Award in New York and was awarded Best Original Screenplay in 1987 by the French Academy of Cinema.

External links

French women screenwriters
French screenwriters
Living people
French women film directors
Film directors from Paris
1960 births
Camille